David Macpherson (born 3 July 1967) is a former professional male tennis player on the ATP Tour. He is the current coach of John Isner and the former coach of Bob and Mike Bryan.

A product of player and coach, Tony Roche's junior tennis academy, he played lefthanded and turned professional in 1985. As a junior player Macpherson was one of Australia's top prospects in his peer group, reaching the U.S. Open Junior Doubles Tournament finals in 1983 and winning the Australia Open Junior Doubles title in 1985 (with Brett Custer).

Known primarily as a doubles specialist, Macpherson's professional career was highlighted by his 1992 season with partner, Steve DeVries, where they won doubles titles in Milan, Manchester, Indian Wells, Atlanta, Charlotte and Brisbane to finish No. 8 in the year end Team Rankings and qualifying for ATP Tour World Doubles Championships.

In November of that year he achieved his high personal rank of No. 11 in the doubles ranking. During his career, Macpherson captured 16 doubles titles on the ATP tour and earned over US$1.7 million in career earnings.

Throughout his pro career, Macpherson was a regular player in World TeamTennis league for the Sacramento and Kansas City Explorers franchises.

Macpherson coached arguably the greatest doubles pair in the history of tennis, Mike and Bob Bryan, from 2005 through 2016. He is now the head coach of The George Washington University's men's tennis team.

Junior Grand Slam finals

Doubles: 1 (1 runner-up)

ATP career finals

Doubles: 29 (16 titles, 13 runner-ups)

ATP Challenger and ITF Futures finals

Doubles: 9 (7–2)

Performance timelines

Singles

Doubles

Mixed Doubles

References

External links
 
 

1967 births
Living people
Australian male tennis players
Australian Open (tennis) junior champions
Australian tennis coaches
People educated at Launceston Church Grammar School
Sportspeople from Launceston, Tasmania
Tennis people from Tasmania
Grand Slam (tennis) champions in boys' doubles